
The Gadamer–Derrida debate concerns the issue of the containment of otherness in Gadamer's hermeneutics and it began with an encounter between Hans-Georg Gadamer and Jacques Derrida in April 1981 in a Sorbonne conference in Paris on "Text and Interpretation". Before this debate, there had not been any confrontation or dialogue between hermeneutics in Germany and post-structuralism in France.

See also 
 Cassirer–Heidegger debate
 Foucault–Habermas debate
 Positivism dispute
 Searle–Derrida debate

Notes

References 
 Michelfelder, Diane. P. and Richard E. Palmer (eds.), 1989, Dialogue and Deconstruction: The Gadamer-Derrida Debate, Albany, NY: SUNY Press.

Jacques Derrida
Continental philosophy
Philosophical debates
Hans-Georg Gadamer
Hermeneutics
April 1981 events in Europe
Post-structuralism